Time in Guinea-Bissau is given by a single time zone, denoted as Greenwich Mean Time (GMT; UTC±00:00). Guinea-Bissau shares this time zone with several other countries, including fourteen in western Africa. Guinea-Bissau does not observe daylight saving time (DST).

IANA time zone database 
In the IANA time zone database, Guinea-Bissau is given one zone in the file zone.tab – Africa/Bissau. "GW" refers to the country's ISO 3166-1 alpha-2 country code. Data for Guinea-Bissau directly from zone.tab of the IANA time zone database; columns marked with * are the columns from zone.tab itself:

See also 
Time in Africa
List of time zones by country

References

External links 
Current time in Guinea-Bissau at Time.is
Time in Guinea-Bissau at TimeAndDate.com

Time in Guinea-Bissau